Class 9, Class 09 and Class IX may refer to:
 BR Standard Class 9F, a steam locomotive class of the United Kingdom
 British Rail Class 09, a diesel locomotive class of the United Kingdom
 Eurotunnel Class 9, an electric class locomotive
 GCR Class 9F, a steam locomotive class of the United Kingdom
 GCR Class 9N, a steam locomotive class of the United Kingdom
 HAZMAT Class 9 Miscellaneous, a category of hazardous material
 NSB Class 9, a standard-gauge steam locomotive class of Norway
 NSB Class IX, a narrow-gauge steam locomotive class of Norway
 NSB El 9, an electric locomotive class of Norway
 Class IX (U.S. Army), Repair parts and components, including kits, assemblies and subassemblies, reparable and nonreparable, required for maintenance support of all equipment